Headless Cross may refer to:

Headless Cross (album), a 1989 album by Black Sabbath
Headless Cross (district), a district of Redditch, England
Headless Cross (railway station), a former railway station near Fauldhouse, Scotland